Nebojša Malbaša (Serbian Cyrillic: Небојша Малбаша; born 25 June 1959) is a Serbian retired footballer who played as a striker.

While at R.F.C. de Liège he helped them win the 1989–90 Belgian Cup. He now works as a scout in Belgrade.

References

1959 births
Living people
Footballers from Belgrade
Yugoslav footballers
Serbian footballers
Serbian expatriate footballers
Yugoslav First League players
Belgian Pro League players
HNK Rijeka players
GNK Dinamo Zagreb players
R. Charleroi S.C. players
RFC Liège players
Standard Liège players
R. Olympic Charleroi Châtelet Farciennes players
Expatriate footballers in Belgium
Association football forwards